The 1979–80 NBA season was the 34th season of the National Basketball Association. The season ended with the Los Angeles Lakers winning the NBA Championship, beating the Philadelphia 76ers 4 games to 2 in the NBA Finals, and is notable for being the year in which the three-point field goal was adopted.

Notable occurrences
An unbalanced schedule is adopted. Teams play each of the other 10 teams within their own conference six times, and the 11 teams from the opposite conference twice each. 
The NBA officially adopts the three-point field goal. Boston Celtics guard Chris Ford made the first three-pointer on October 12, 1979, against the Houston Rockets.
The number of officials is reduced from three to two following a one-season experiment with three-man officiating crews. The three-official system will be re-adopted permanently for the 1988–89 season. 
The Jazz relocate from New Orleans, Louisiana, to Salt Lake City, Utah, and move from the Central Division to the Midwest Division (with the Indiana Pacers replacing them).
The Kansas City Kings are forced to play most of the season at the Municipal Auditorium after the roof at Kemper Arena collapses due to high wind on June 4, 1979. The Kings played the 1972–73 and 1973–74 seasons at Municipal Auditorium while splitting their home schedule between Kansas City and Omaha.
Dr. Jerry Buss purchases the Los Angeles Lakers franchise from Jack Kent Cooke prior to the season.
The 1980 NBA All-Star Game was played at the Capital Centre in Landover, Maryland, with the East defeating the West 144–136 in overtime. George Gervin of the San Antonio Spurs wins the game's MVP award.
This was the first season the NBA had a cable television partner. The USA Network signed a three-year, 1.5 million dollar deal.
This was both Magic Johnson’s and Larry Bird’s rookie seasons and is considered to be the birth of the modern game.
Darryl Dawkins broke two backboards: one at Kansas City's Municipal Auditorium on November 13, 1979, and a second backboard 23 days later at the Philadelphia Spectrum. Because his dunks resulted in delays while teams went to find another backboard, the NBA eventually modified their basketball rims to make them collapsible.
Former NBA official and CBS analyst Mendy Rudolph died on July 4, 1979. All NBA referee shirts sport the No. 5 patch in his honor, and it was retired permanently.
Finishing 16–66, the Detroit Pistons suffer the worst NBA record since the infamous 1972–73 76ers won only nine games. In between, no team had won fewer than 22 in a season, but expansion and the availability of more-skilled players from overseas made such poor records more common in subsequent seasons.
It was the final season for future hall of famers Rick Barry, Walt Frazier and Pete Maravich.
Kareem Abdul-Jabbar won MVP for the sixth time in his career, which remains the league's record-best.

Final standings

By division

By conference

Notes
z – Clinched home court advantage for the entire playoffs and first round bye
c – Clinched home court advantage for the conference playoffs and first round bye
y – Clinched division title and first round bye
x – Clinched playoff spot

Playoffs
Teams in bold advanced to the next round. The numbers to the left of each team indicate the team's seeding in its conference, and the numbers to the right indicate the number of games the team won in that round. The division champions are marked by an asterisk. Home court advantage does not necessarily belong to the higher-seeded team, but instead the team with the better regular season record; teams enjoying the home advantage are shown in italics.

Statistics leaders

NBA awards
Most Valuable Player: Kareem Abdul-Jabbar, Los Angeles Lakers
Rookie of the Year: Larry Bird, Boston Celtics
Coach of the Year: Bill Fitch, Boston Celtics

All-NBA First Team:
G – Paul Westphal, Phoenix Suns
G – George Gervin, San Antonio Spurs
F – Julius Erving, Philadelphia 76ers
F – Larry Bird, Boston Celtics
C – Kareem Abdul-Jabbar, Los Angeles Lakers

All-NBA Second Team:
F – Dan Roundfield, Atlanta Hawks
F – Marques Johnson, Milwaukee Bucks
C – Moses Malone, Houston Rockets
G – Dennis Johnson, Seattle SuperSonics
G – Gus Williams, Seattle SuperSonics

All-NBA Rookie Team:
Larry Bird, Boston Celtics
Magic Johnson, Los Angeles Lakers
Bill Cartwright, New York Knicks
David Greenwood, Chicago Bulls
Calvin Natt, Portland Trail Blazers

NBA All-Defensive First Team:
Bobby Jones, Philadelphia 76ers
Dan Roundfield, Atlanta Hawks
Kareem Abdul-Jabbar, Los Angeles Lakers
Dennis Johnson, Seattle SuperSonics
Don Buse, Phoenix Suns (tie)
Micheal Ray Richardson, New York Knicks (tie)

NBA All-Defensive Second Team:
Scott Wedman, Kansas City Kings
Kermit Washington, Portland Trail Blazers
Dave Cowens, Boston Celtics
Quinn Buckner, Milwaukee Bucks
Eddie Johnson, Atlanta Hawks

Players of the week

Players of the month

Notes

 Inducted into the Hall of Fame as a coach.

References